Estadio Ciudad de Málaga is a multi-purpose stadium in Málaga, Spain. The facility can accommodate 10,816 spectators.

History
Construction of the stadium began in December 2003 and it was put into use in 2005, although the facility was not fully ready at that time. It was reopened after the completion of the works on 27 June 2009.

Athletics
The venue hosted the 2006 European Athletics Cup, and also the Spanish Athletics Championships in 2005 and 2011.

Football
In 2009, the women's football team Málaga CF Femenino began using the Ciudad de Málaga stadium as their usual field of play for Primera División matches and also as a training venue. The men's Málaga CF team began training there during the 2010–2011 Segunda División season.

In July 2020, the stadium hosted some matches in the promotion phase to the men's Segunda División.

International football matches have also been played at the venue.

Rugby union
On November 19, 2016, the first international rugby was played at Ciudad de Málaga stadium. It was a test match for the Spanish national team against Uruguay that ended with victory for the "XV del León" home team in front of more than 10,000 spectators.

Sevens

The stadium was a venue for the Spain Sevens leg of the World Rugby Sevens Series in 2022.

References

Football venues in Andalusia
Athletics (track and field) venues in Spain
Multi-purpose stadiums in Spain
Estadio Ciudad de Málaga
Sports venues in Andalusia
Sports venues completed in 2009
Rugby union stadiums in Spain
2003 establishments in Spain